Hetzel is a surname. Notable people with the surname include:

Amy Hetzel (born 1983), Australian water polo player
Basil Hetzel (1922–2017), Australian medical researcher
Eric Hetzel (born 1963), American baseball player
Fred Hetzel (born 1942), American basketball player
George Hetzel (1826–1899), American painter
Patrick Hetzel (born 1964), French Member of Parliament
Phyllis Hetzel (1918–2011), British civil servant
Pierre-Jules Hetzel (1814–1886), French editor and publisher
Ralph D. Hetzel (1882–1947), American academic and educator
William C. Hetzel, technology expert

Surnames
Surnames of French origin
Surnames of Belgian origin
French-language surnames